Xanthoparmelia subverrucigera is a species of saxicolous (rock-dwelling), foliose lichen in the family Parmeliaceae. Found in Spain and Zimbabwe, it was formally described as a new species in 2005 by lichenologists Oscar Blanco, Ana Crespo, and John Elix. It has also been collected from Rhodes Matopos National Park in Zimbabwe. The specific epithet subverrucigera alludes to its resemblance with X. verrucigera.

Xanthoparmelia subverrucigera contains several secondary compounds, including stictic acid and constictic acid as major metabolites, usnic acid, verrucigeric acid, lusitanic acid, and cryptostictic acid as minor metabolites, and trace amounts of connorstictic acid, and methylstictic acid.

See also
List of Xanthoparmelia species

References

subverrucigera
Lichen species
Lichens described in 2005
Lichens of Europe
Taxa named by Ana Crespo
Taxa named by John Alan Elix
Lichens of Zimbabwe